The Marine Station or Marine Terminal is a marine passenger terminal in Saint Petersburg. It was opened in 1982 specifically for the reception and processing of cruise and ferry vessels. The station is located on the western tip of Vasilyevsky Island, at No. 1, . The complex includes five berths, a place for border and customs inspection, restaurant, hotel and conference complex.

The station building was built between 1973 and 1983, designed by architects V. A. Sokhin and Leonid Kalyagin. The walls of the station are lined with volumetric panels in the form of sails; a ship is depicted on a 78-meter titanium spire. Originally the building was built for the Baltic Sea Steamship Company and served as both a station for visitors arriving by sea and as an inter-voyage base for the sailors of the shipping company.

References

External links 
 
 Photo Marine Station

Buildings and structures in Saint Petersburg
Ports and harbours of Russia
Ferry terminals in Russia
Transport in Saint Petersburg